Telchin is a genus of moths within the family Castniidae.

Species
Telchin licus (Drury, 1773)
Telchin syphax (Fabricius, 1775)

Castniomera atymnius is sometimes included in the genus Telchin.

References

Castniidae